Nightnoise is a studio album released by Billy Oskay and Mícheál Ó Domhnaill.

Track listing 

 "Nightnoise" by Billy Oskay (4:17)
 "The 19A" by Mícheál Ó Domhnaill (3:08)
 "Bridges" by Mícheál Ó Domhnaill (7:43)
 "False Spring" by Billy Oskay and D. Bottemiller (4:12)
 "Duo" by Billy Oskay (3:32)
 "City Nights" by Billy Oskay (3:26)
 "After Five" by Mícheál Ó Domhnaill (3:12)
 "Menucha (A Place With Water)" by Billy Oskay (4:33)
 "The American Lass" by Mícheál Ó Domhnaill (3:05)
 "The Cricket's Wicket" by Mícheál Ó Domhnaill (6:16)

Credits 

 Billy Oskay – piano (4,6,8), violin, viola, engineer, producer 
 Mícheál Ó Domhnaill – guitar, whistler, piano, harmonium (3,7,9,10), assistant engineer, producer 
 Tommy Thompson – bass (1,6)
 Anne Robinson – graphic design
 Steve Harper – cover photography
 Steve Miller – engineer mix consultant
 Mike Moore – engineer mix 
 Cricket – itself
 Recorded during 1983 at the home of Billy Oskay, Portland, OR 
 Mixed in February 1984 at Recording Associates, Portland, OR 
 Original mastering by Bernie Grundman Mastering, Hollywood, CA 
 Special thanks to Windell Oskay, Peggy Feindt, Tom Bocci, Barry Poss, Steven Miller, and Mike Moore
 Instruments: 1962 viola and 1964 violin by William F. Oskay, 1977 guitar by Kenny White, Yamaha C7D grand piano, harmonium, and whistles

References 

1984 albums
Mícheál Ó Domhnaill albums